Jean-Marc Brondolo is a French screenwriter and director.

Theater

Filmography

References

External links

Living people
French film directors
French male screenwriters
French screenwriters
French-language film directors
Year of birth missing (living people)
French television directors